William Abraham (1840 – 2 August 1915) was an Irish Member of Parliament (MP) in the United Kingdom House of Commons. He was born in Limerick.

Although a Protestant in religion (a Congregationalist), he became active in Irish Nationalist politics. He was involved in the Irish Land League in 1881 and was at one stage imprisoned as a political suspect. He served as Chairman of Limerick Board of Guardians (who administered the Poor Law in their district) 1882–1883 and 1885–1886.

Abraham represented three constituencies at Westminster. He was elected unopposed as MP for West Limerick at the 1885 general election as a Nationalist supporter of the Irish Parliamentary Party, and served until he retired in 1892. In December 1890, he was the proposer of the vote of no confidence in Charles Stewart Parnell as leader in Committee Room 15, and he joined the Anti-Parnellite Irish National Federation. In 1893, he was elected unopposed as an Anti-Parnellite Nationalist at a by-election for North-East Cork, succeeding Michael Davitt, and sat until he was defeated in the January 1910 general election by the dissident Nationalist William O'Brien, by the wide margin of 2,984 votes to 1,510. He was unopposed at the by-election for Dublin Harbour in June 1910, and won comfortably against an O'Brienite Nationalist in the same seat in the general election of December 1910. He represented Dublin Harbour until his death in 1915.

According to the Irish Independent, he was assiduous in his duties at Westminster, and spoke at one time or another in every constituency in Great Britain, including Orkney and Shetland. He was a Treasurer of his party, and a prominent member of the Public Accounts Committee of the House of Commons. However, in Maume's view, his age and lack of local contacts made him ineffective in his final role as a Dublin MP.

References

Sources
 Irish Independent, 3 August 1915
 
  Who's Who of British Members of Parliament, Vol. II 1886-1918, edited by M. Stenton & S. Lees (The Harvester Press 1978)
 
 Parliamentary Election Results in Ireland 1801-1922, edited by Brian M. Walker (Dublin, Royal Irish Academy 1978)

External links 
 

1840 births
1915 deaths
Anti-Parnellite MPs
Irish Congregationalists
Irish Parliamentary Party MPs
Members of the Parliament of the United Kingdom for County Limerick constituencies (1801–1922)
Members of the Parliament of the United Kingdom for County Cork constituencies (1801–1922)
Members of the Parliament of the United Kingdom for County Dublin constituencies (1801–1922)
Politicians from Limerick (city)
UK MPs 1885–1886
UK MPs 1886–1892
UK MPs 1892–1895
UK MPs 1895–1900
UK MPs 1900–1906
UK MPs 1906–1910
UK MPs 1910
UK MPs 1910–1918